Burkett Restaurant Equipment & Supplies is a nationally known food-service equipment and supplies dealer, headquartered in Perrysburg, Ohio, USA.  Founded by Jameel Burkett (Sr.) and Mike Burkett, the company (aka Burkett & Sons Inc.) has been family-owned and operated since 1977. The company had no web presence until 2005 when the younger Jameel Burkett became vice president of operations. In 2006, the company won contracts with rapidly growing national chain Marco's Pizza, which it used as its preferred supplier of pizza ovens and dough mixers. The company appeared in the Inc. magazine 2010 "Inc. 5000" list of the fastest-growing companies in the US. For the year ending 2021, Burkett Restaurant Equipment was ranked #43 for food equipment dealers in Foodservice Equipment & Supplies magazine.

References

External links 
 Company web site
  Company profile on inc.com

Distribution companies of the United States
Companies based in Toledo, Ohio